Emma Ronsiek is an American college basketball player for the Creighton Bluejays of the Big East Conference.

High school career
Ronsiek played basketball for O'Gorman Catholic High School in Sioux Falls, South Dakota. As a freshman, she helped her team win the Class AA state tournament, its first state title since 1995. In her senior season, Ronsiek led O'Gorman to a 21–0 record before the state tournament was canceled amid the COVID-19 pandemic. She was named Miss Basketball and Gatorade Player of the Year in South Dakota, and earned Argus Leader Basketball Player and Athlete of the Year honors. Ronsiek left as the program's all-time leading scorer. She committed to playing college basketball for Creighton over offers from Colorado State, Green Bay and South Dakota. In addition to basketball, Ronsiek was an all-state volleyball player in high school, leading the team to the Class AA state title game as a senior and breaking the program record for kills.

College career
As a freshman at Creighton, Ronsiek averaged 11.6 points and 5.1 rebounds per game, earning Big East All-Freshman honors. On January 16, 2022, she scored a career-high 30 points in an 86–60 win over St. John's. Ronsiek helped 10th-seeded Creighton reach its first Elite Eight at the 2022 NCAA tournament. She averaged 13.9 points and five rebounds per game as a sophomore and was a first-team All-Big East selection.

Personal life
Ronsiek's parents both played college basketball: her mother, Mary Beth, at Dakota Wesleyan and her father, Randy, at Westmar. Her younger sister, Hannah, plays basketball for Colorado State and was her teammate in high school. Ronsiek's older brother, Luke, played college basketball for Mount Marty.

References

External links
Creighton Bluejays bio

Living people
American women's basketball players
Sportspeople from Sioux Falls, South Dakota
Basketball players from South Dakota
Creighton Bluejays women's basketball players
Small forwards
Power forwards (basketball)
Year of birth missing (living people)